Habaraduwa railway station is a railway station located at Habaraduwa, on the coastal railway line of Sri Lanka. 

The station is situated between Koggala and Taple railway stations and is  along the railway line from the Colombo Fort Railway Station. The trains run multiple services to Colombo Fort and Matara daily.

The railway station was opened on 26 November 2017 by Minister of Transport, Nimal Siripala de Silva.

Continuity

References

Railway stations on the Coastal Line
Railway stations in Galle District